William Bynum may refer to:
 William D. Bynum (1846–1927), US politician from Indiana
W. F. Bynum, British historian
Bill Bynum, American businessperson and philanthropist